Paul Kaznelson (1898–1959) was a Polish-born Czech scientist credited with describing the first case of pure red cell aplasia. He is also known for his contribution to the discovery of the therapeutic role of splenectomy in idiopathic thrombocytopenic purpura.

Much of his academic work appeared in the 1920s and 1930s, when he used to work at the Charles University in Prague.

See also 
 Hermann Schloffer

References

Sources
Ludmila Hlaváčková – Petr Svobodný, Biographisches Lexikon der Deutschen medizinischen Fakultät in Prag 1883–1945, Prague: Karolinum publishing house, 1998, p. 107. .

Czech scientists
Scientists from Warsaw
19th-century Polish Jews
1898 births
1959 deaths
Date of death missing
Place of death missing
Polish emigrants to Czechoslovakia